Bienvenue Dieudonne Nnengue or Bienvenue Nnengue or Nnengue Bienvenue, (born July 19, 1984 in Yaoundé, Cameroon) is a Cameroonian footballer who plays as a central striker.

Career

Cameroon
He started his football in the youth team in Otélé named Otele Football at the 2000–01 season. In 2001–02 season he moved to Vogt Athletic.

From 2002 to 2004 he played for Championnat Régional du Centre football club as Likie FC.

In 2004 season he moved to Cameroonian Premier League club Tonnerre Yaoundé and in the next season he move to Renaissance de Ngoumou.

From 2006 season to 2007-08 season he played for Tiko United before he moved to the Indonesia football competition in 2008–09 season.

Indonesia
He started his career in Indonesia with played for PSIS Semarang in 2008-09 Indonesia Super League.

In 2009-10 season he moved to play for PSBI Blitar where he scored 5 goals for the club.

Start from 2010-11 season he currently played for Barito Putera last season he scored 7 goals from 20 appearance. This season he play 15 appearance with 6 goals for the club.

References

External links
 

1984 births
Living people
Footballers from Yaoundé
Cameroonian footballers
Association football forwards
Tiko United players
Cameroonian expatriate footballers
Expatriate footballers in Indonesia
Cameroonian expatriate sportspeople in Indonesia
Liga 1 (Indonesia) players